Chapmans Torg is a tram stop of the Gothenburg tram network, located not far from the Spar Hotel Majorna and the Majorna bibilothek. Like Masthuggstorget, is one of the only tram stops which separated via a grassway.

Rail transport in Gothenburg